Martha Hollander (born March 24, 1959) is an American poet and art historian.

Life
She is the daughter of the poet John Hollander and the fashion historian Anne Hollander. Hollander graduated from Yale University in 1980, with a B.A. cum laude in Art. She later studied at University of California at Berkeley, where she received M.A. in 1985 and a Ph.D. in 1990, both in Art History. In 1989 she won the Walt Whitman Award from the Academy of American Poets. She is Professor of Art History at Hofstra University, having also taught at the Pratt Institute, Parsons the New School for Design, School of Visual Arts, University at Albany, SUNY, and UCLA. She lives in Jackson Heights, New York, with her husband, Jonathan Bumas, and two children.

Her poems have appeared in many journals, including the Southampton Review The Minnesota Review,Poetry The Paris Review, Raritan Quarterly, and The Southwest Review.

Works

Poetry 
 
  (chapbook)

Art History

References

External links
 Hofstra faculty website

1950s births
Living people
Yale University alumni
University of California, Berkeley alumni
Hofstra University faculty
University at Albany, SUNY faculty
Pratt Institute faculty
University of California, Los Angeles faculty
American women poets
Jewish American poets
Writers from Queens, New York
People from Jackson Heights, Queens
American women academics
21st-century American Jews
21st-century American women